Konankeri is a village in Haveri district in Karnataka, India. Konankeri being the central spot where three roads meet and is an important brick-manufacturing village.

References

Villages in Haveri district